Hidcote may refer to:

 Hidcote Bartrim, a village in Gloucestershire
 Hidcote Manor Garden, a garden owned by the National Trust
 Lavandula angustifolia 'Hidcote', a cultivar of lavender
 Symphytum grandiflorum, a cultivar of comfrey